Tidikelt (also known as Tidikelt Tamazight, Tamazight or Tidikelt Berber) is a Zenati Berber language spoken in Algeria. It is one of the Mzab–Wargla languages. Tidikelt is spoken in the northwest of Tamanrasset Province, including in In Salah District. Tidikelt Tamazight has two dialects; Tidikelt and Tit. Tidikelt Tamazight is considered to be an endangered language, nearly extinct, with only 1,000 speakers of the language and decreasing.

Classification
Tidikelt Tamazight is part of the Berber branch of the Afroasiatic family.

History
The northern region of Africa was, at one point in history, was primarily inhabited by Berbers. The name Berber comes from Barbari, which was used by the Romans. Barbari is a Latin word meaning Barbarians. Their tribes could be found across the northern region. However, when the Muslims invaded and took over the northern region of Africa, they spread the Arabic language, which eventually led to the diminished use of Tidikelt Tamazight. As the Arabic language spread, so did the religion of Islam. Considering that the Arabic language and Islam were very closely related, and many of the Berbers were converting to Islam, Tidikelt Tamazight began to fade.

Geographic distribution
There are about 1,000 speakers of Tidikelt Tamazight. Most of these speakers can be found in the northwest of Tamanrasset Province, Algeria. There are Tidikelt Tamazight speakers also found in Western Sahara, Morocco and Tunisia.

Status
Tidikelt Tamazight is endangered, nearly extinct.

References

Berber languages
Extinct languages of Africa
Riff languages